() refers to two major military offensives undertaken by the Netherlands on Java and Sumatra against the Republic of Indonesia during its struggle for independence in the Indonesian National Revolution.

 Operation Product took place from 21 July until 5 August 1947.
 Product North referred to the amphibious landing on Pasir Putih, East Java.
 Product East encompassed the amphibious action in the Meneng Bay.
 Product South referred to the southward offensive launched from Porong.

 Operation Kraai, took place from 19 December 1948 until 5 January 1949.
 Actions of the Mariniersbrigade in East Java were instead referred to as Operation Zeemeeuw.

Other "police actions"
 Operation Trackman (Gresik, 10 Augustus 1946)
 Operation Quantico (Gresik, 19 August 1946)
 Operation Ideaal (Mojokerto, 17 March 1947)
 Malang Operation (30 June 1947)
 Operation Carthago (Asembagus, 5 September 1947)
 Operation Albatros (Pacitan, 12 January 1949)
 Operation Otter (Prigi Bay, 7–18 April 1949)
 Paciran Operation (20–28 May 1949)

References

Further reading
 Heijboer, P., De Politionele Acties - De strijd om 'Indië' 1945/1949, Haarlem: Fibula-van Dishoeck, 1979. 
 Teitler, G. & Groen, P.M.H., De Politionele acties: afwikkeling en verwerking, Amsterdam: De Bataafsche Leeuw, 1987. 
 Jong, L. de, Het Koninkrijk der Nederlanden in de Tweede Wereldoorlog, volume 12, The Hague: Sdu, 1988.

Indonesian National Revolution
1947 in the Dutch East Indies
1949 in the Dutch East Indies

nl:Indonesische Onafhankelijkheidsoorlog